Sleeuwijk is a village in the Dutch province of North Brabant and part of the municipality of Altena.

History 
The village was first mentioned in 1268 as "Tyberio de Slewijck" and is a combination of neighbourhood and blunt. The village is known for its ferry to Gorinchem which has been known to exist since 1327. In 2017, it was announced that the Merwedebrug which be replaced by a wider bridge, because it has become too narrow.

Historically, it was part of the Land of Altena and was administered by Woudrichem. Since about 1815, Sleeuwijk had been part of the municipality of De Werken en Sleeuwijk. Sleeuwijk was home to 380 people in 1840. This had an area of 2111 ha. In 1950, the then 4,218 inhabitants municipality was merged into the municipality of Werkendam, a municipality which was greatly enlarged in 1973. In 2012, the village had 5,349 inhabitants.

Overview 
The village is home to various sports clubs, including tennis, swimming, ice skating and korfball, two primary and two secondary schools and a number of shops in the shopping centre called de Nieuwe Es.

Gallery

References

Populated places in North Brabant
Geography of Altena, North Brabant